Pietro Bruschi (born 20 June 1952) is an Italian sprint canoer, born in Castel Gandolfo, who competed in the mid-1970s. At the 1976 Summer Olympics in Montreal, he was eliminated in the repechages of the C-1 500 m and eliminated in the semifinals of the C-1 1000 m events.

References
Sports-reference.com profile

1952 births
Canoeists at the 1976 Summer Olympics
Italian male canoeists
Living people
Olympic canoeists of Italy
People from Castel Gandolfo
Sportspeople from the Metropolitan City of Rome Capital